Presidents of the Republic of China (Taiwan) have often kept pets while in office.

In addition to traditional pets, this list includes some animals normally considered livestock or working animals that have a close association with presidents or their families; occasionally the animals were given to the presidents from foreign dignitaries.

See also
 Canadian Parliamentary Cats
 Chief Mouser to the Cabinet Office, United Kingdom
 Hermitage cats in Saint Petersburg, Russia
 Pets of Vladimir Putin
 Paddles, First Cat of New Zealand
 Tibs the Great
 Pets of the British Royal Family
 United States presidential pets

References

Animals in politics
Presidency of the Republic of China